Qaleh-ye Ahmad Beyk (also Romanized as Qal‘eh-ye Aḩmad Beyk) is a village in Bayat Rural District, Nowbaran District, Saveh County, Markazi Province, Iran. At the 2006 census, its population was 81, in 39 families.

References 

Populated places in Saveh County